Philip Anthony Esposito  (born February 20, 1942) is a Canadian former professional ice hockey player, coach and executive, and current broadcaster for the Tampa Bay Lightning.  A member of the Hockey Hall of Fame, he played 18 seasons in the National Hockey League for the Chicago Black Hawks, Boston Bruins, and New York Rangers, winning two Stanley Cups with Boston. 

He is considered one of the greatest players of all time, and is the older brother of fellow Hall-of-Famer Tony Esposito, a goaltender. He became the first player to score more than 100 points in a season, with 126 in 1968-69, a feat he would later achieve a further 5 times, also becoming the first player to score 50 goals in a season 5 times in a row, including the then record of 76 goals in 1970-71 to go with the then record 152 points the same year.  Altogether, he won the Art Ross Trophy as the leading point scorer five times, lead the league in goals six times, was voted the MVP by winning the Hart Trophy twice, and was named as a first team All-Star centre six times.

After retiring as a player, Esposito served as head coach and general manager for the Rangers for two seasons. In 1991, he and his younger brother co-founded the Tampa Bay Lightning, the first NHL expansion team in Florida. The elder Esposito served as the franchise's first president and general manager until 1998; he now serves as Tampa Bay's radio colour commentator.

In 2017, Esposito was named one of the '100 Greatest NHL Players' in history. His #7 jersey was retired by the Bruins on December 3, 1987, and there is a statue in his likeness at Tampa Bay's Amalie Arena.

Playing career

Minor league
Esposito signed with the Chicago Black Hawks as a teenager and was assigned to the Sarnia Legionnaires Jr. 'B' hockey team for the 1960–61 season. In just 32 games with the Legionnaires, he scored 47 goals and 61 assists, for 108 points - a scoring pace of 3.3 points per game. In a playoff game, he scored 12 points in one game as the Legionnaires advanced to the Western Ontario final before being eliminated.
After a sparkling junior season with the St. Catharines Teepees of the Ontario Hockey Association in 1962, Esposito spent two seasons with Chicago's minor league affiliate, the St. Louis Braves, scoring 90 points in his first season and 80 points in only 46 games in his second.

Chicago Black Hawks
Midway through the 1964 season, Esposito was called up to the parent Black Hawks to make his NHL debut. Centreing for the great Bobby Hull beginning in the 1965 season, he proved himself a quality playmaker, twice finishing amongst the League-leading scorers over the next three seasons.

Boston Bruins

In 1967, Esposito was dealt with Ken Hodge and Fred Stanfield to the Boston Bruins in a blockbuster trade. While Hodge and Stanfield rose to become stars in Boston, Esposito blossomed into the greatest scorer of his day. In 1969, he became the first NHL player to score 100 points in a season, far eclipsing the "century" mark with a record 126. He would fall a single point shy in 1970, then reached triple digits again the next five years running.  Along the way, he captured the Art Ross Trophy as the top regular-season scorer in 1969 and 1971 to 1974, and led the League in goals six straight seasons between 1969–70 and 1974–75.

Esposito was named to the NHL's first All-Star team six consecutive times (from 1969 to 1974), and won the Hart Memorial Trophy as the NHL's most valuable player in 1969 and 1974. His Boston fans, celebrating his scoring touch during his heyday, displayed bumper stickers that read, "Jesus saves, Espo scores on the rebound." Esposito, while not a fast or graceful skater, was best known for his unmovable presence in front of the opposition net from which he could score from all angles. Esposito has said, "Scoring is easy. You simply stand in the slot, take your beating and shoot the puck into the net."  He also possessed a combination of skating and stickhandling ability, strength, and long reach that enabled him to "rag the puck," holding onto it for long periods of time in the face of opponents' checks and thus enabling his team to kill off penalties.

During his prime, Esposito centred one of the most renowned forward lines in history, featuring Ken Hodge on his right wing and Wayne Cashman on his left. Esposito and fellow superstar Bobby Orr led the Bruins to Stanley Cup victories in 1970 and 1972, and first-place finishes in the League in 1971, 1972 and 1974.

During 1970–71, Esposito shattered the record for most goals in a season, finishing with 76. The mark stood until 1982, when Wayne Gretzky scored his 77th, 78th and 79th goals against the Buffalo Sabres on February 24, 1982, at the Buffalo Memorial Auditorium. Esposito was on hand to present the game puck to Gretzky. Esposito also set the single-season point-scoring record in 1971 with 152, a mark later raised by Gretzky to 215. Only three others have reached the 150 point plateau — Mario Lemieux (4 times), Steve Yzerman and Bernie Nicholls — and only Gretzky, Lemieux, Brett Hull, Teemu Selänne and Alexander Mogilny have matched or bettered Esposito's 76 goals in a season. The 1970 season also saw Esposito shatter the single-season mark for shots on goal, tallying 550. Only one other player has come within 100 shots of this record, Alexander Ovechkin in 2008–09, in a season that was four games longer than when it was set.

As of May 31, 2021, Esposito ranked second in all-time regular-season goals for Boston with 459 (behind only Johnny Bucyk's 545).  As of 2022, Esposito third behind Cam Neely and Patrice Bergeron in all-time Bruins playoff goals with 46. Esposito holds the Boston record for most playoff hat-tricks with four, one of which was a four-goal game versus Toronto in 1969.  Often used to kill penalties, Esposito scored 20 shorthanded goals for Boston over his career.

After his performance in the Summit Series, where he was the Captain and inspirational leader for Canada and its leading scorer in the series, Esposito won the 1972 Lou Marsh Trophy as Canada's outstanding male athlete of the year and was made an Officer of the Order of Canada. He also scored the first goal of the series and he scored or assisted four times in the deciding game. During that series, his scolding of Canadian fans, who booed the national team after a 5–3 loss to the Soviet Union in Game Four, was credited with firing up his teammates:

"If the Russian fans boo their players in Moscow like you people are booing us, I'll come back and apologize personally to every one of you, but I really don't think that will happen. We gave it and are doing our best. All of us guys are really disheartened. . . We came out here because we love Canada. They're a good hockey team, and we don't know what we could do better, but I promise we will figure it out. But it's totally ridiculous – I don't think it is fair that we should be booed."

Esposito also played for Canada in the inaugural Canada Cup in 1976, on a line with Hall-of-Famers Bobby Hull and Marcel Dionne. The following year, he would represent Canada once more in the 1977 World Championships in Vienna.

New York Rangers
In 1975–76, Esposito was traded because he did not want to relinquish his playing time, even with his age. He and Carol Vadnais were traded to the New York Rangers on November 7 in exchange for Brad Park, Joe Zanussi and Jean Ratelle. This trade was monumental, as Esposito was still a great scorer, but Ratelle was a skilled centre and Park was arguably the second best defenceman in the NHL, behind Bobby Orr.

While not as glittering an offensive force as in his glory days, as captain of the Rangers, Esposito led the team in points each of his full seasons with the club and remained an effective scorer until his final season. The highlight of his years in New York was leading the Rangers to the Stanley Cup Final in 1979 where, at 37 years of age, he finished third in post-season scoring.

On November 4, 1977, Esposito scored his 600th NHL goal, against the Vancouver Canucks in Vancouver, becoming the first player to reach that milestone in a Rangers uniform.

Esposito retired in 1981, behind only Gordie Howe in career goals and total points, and third in assists to Howe and Stan Mikita.

Post-playing career

New York Rangers
Esposito served as general manager and head coach of the Rangers for three years in the mid-1980s, during which he earned the nickname "Trader Phil" for the numerous transactions he made. During his tenure as GM, he made more trades than the Vancouver Canucks had made in the entire 1980s. While serving as GM, two of his most famous trades included the trade for the legendary Marcel Dionne and one in which he sent a first-round pick to the Quebec Nordiques as compensation for signing Michel Bergeron to be the Rangers' head coach.

Tampa Bay Lightning

Founder and Manager
When the NHL announced its expansion plans in the late 1980s, Phil Esposito, along with his brother Tony, sought to place a franchise in Tampa Bay, Florida. They faced competition from the Compuware Group, which wanted to place a team in nearby St. Petersburg, Florida. It was proposed to Esposito that he merge his bid with the Compuware Group, which he refused. His reputation and force of personality was widely credited with winning the expansion bid for Tampa Bay on December 6, 1990. The Tampa Bay Lightning would start play in the 1992–93 NHL season, with the elder Esposito as the team's first president and general manager. 

For the Lightning's inaugural season, Esposito hired many of his former teammates from the Bruins, including Cashman as an assistant coach and former Bruins trainer John "Frosty" Forristal as trainer. He also made hockey history by signing Manon Rhéaume, making her the first woman to sign with and play for an NHL team. 

However, one of the Esposito group's key backers, the Pritzker family, had backed out a few months before the bid, to be replaced by a Japanese consortium headed by Kokusai Green, a golf course and resort operator. Though Kokusai Green had helped the Esposito's secure the initial bid, the team languished under their ownership; financed almost entirely by loans, the Lightning were constantly short of cash, hampering Esposito's ability to function as GM. Kokusai Green's owner, Takashi Okubo, never met with the Espositos (or with any other NHL officials), and it was rumored that the consortium was a criminal front for the yakuza. The Lightning quickly fell to the bottom of the league and Esposito fired head coach Terry Crisp in 1997. Even with interim coach Jacques Demers, who had enjoyed successful tenures with the Red Wings and Canadiens, the Lightning lost 55 games for a franchise-worst .268 winning percentage.

Kokusai Green sold the Lightning to insurance tycoon Art Williams in 1998. Shortly after taking control, Williams fired both Esposito brothers two games into the 1998–99 season.

Broadcaster
After his firing, Esposito returned to the Lightning organization for the 1999–00 season as a radio colour commentator. He still calls home games on WHPT (and previously, on WFLA), along with play-by-play commentator Dave Mishkin. Esposito also co-hosts a daily call-in show on SiriusXM's SiriusXM NHL Network Radio channel.

Honours
Esposito was elected to the Hockey Hall of Fame in 1984. On December 3, 1987, his #7 jersey was retired by the Boston Bruins in an emotional ceremony where the then-current wearer, superstar defenceman Ray Bourque, pulled off his #7 jersey to reveal his new number, 77—dramatically "surrendering" his old number in Esposito's favour (coincidentally, Esposito wore #77 with the New York Rangers, because #7 was already being worn by Rod Gilbert). Esposito was "visibly moved" when Bourque showed the Boston Garden crowd his new number, which he used for the rest of his career. Esposito was also on hand in Boston to hand Bourque his retired number after the latter retired.

Esposito's younger brother Tony is also an honoured member of the Hockey Hall of Fame. Former NHL player Alexander Selivanov is Esposito's son-in-law.

Awards and achievements
 NHL second All-Star team (1968, 1975)
 Played in NHL All-Star Game (1969, 1970, 1971, 1972, 1973, 1974, 1975, 1977, 1978, 1980)
 Art Ross Trophy winner (1969, 1971, 1972, 1973, 1974) 
 Hart Memorial Trophy winner (1969, 1974) 
 NHL first All-Star team (1969, 1970, 1971, 1972, 1973, 1974)
 Stanley Cup champion (1970, 1972)
 Lester B. Pearson Award winner (1971, 1974)
 Received Golden Plate Award of the American Academy of Achievement in 1972.
 Won Lou Marsh Trophy as Canadian athlete of the year in 1972.
 Lester Patrick Trophy winner (1978)
 Inducted into the Hockey Hall of Fame in 1984.
 His #7 Jersey was retired by the Boston Bruins on December 3, 1987.
 Retired as the second leading all-time NHL goal and point scorer, and third in assists.
 Among the all-time NHL leaders in goals scored (7th), assists (21st), and total points (10th).
 1968–69 – First player in NHL history to reach 100 points in a single season (finished with 126)
 First player in NHL history to score 1,000 points in a decade (1970s).
 Holds the record for shots on goal in a single season with 550 in 1970–71.
 All-time leader in game-winning goals with 118. (tied by fellow Bruin Jaromír Jágr on April 21, 2013)  
 Had thirteen consecutive 30+ goal seasons, second most in NHL history.
 In 1998, he was ranked number 18 on The Hockey News''' list of the 100 Greatest Hockey Players.
 Inducted into the Ontario Sports Hall of Fame in 2004.
 Inducted in 2007 (alongside brother Tony) into the Sault Ste Marie Walk of Fame.
 In the 2009 book 100 Ranger Greats, was ranked No. 23 all-time of the 901 New York Rangers who had played during the team's first 82 seasons
 Received a star on the Italian Walk of Fame in Toronto in 2009.
 Statue unveiled in his honour in front of the Tampa Bay Times Forum (now Amalie Arena) on December 31, 2011.
 Inducted into the Florida Sports Hall of Fame in 2016.
 In 2017, Esposito was named one of the '100 Greatest NHL Players' in history.
 In 2023, Esposito was named as one of the inaugural members of the Tampa Bay Lightning Hall of Fame.

Career statistics
Regular season and playoffs

International

Head coaching record

In popular culture
Esposito and New York Rangers teammates Ron Duguay, Dave Maloney and Anders Hedberg famously appeared in a TV commercial for Sasson designer jeans in 1979. In 1979, Esposito and Ranger teammates recorded a song written by Alan Thicke as a fundraiser for the Juvenile Diabetes Research Foundation called "Hockey Sock Rock".

Esposito makes an appearance in the 2015 animated Christmas special, The Curse of Clara: A Holiday Tale, both as a young ballet dancer's imaginary mentor and as the actual person performing a cameo in The Nutcracker. He voiced the role himself.

Esposito also appeared in a recurring role for several episodes as a fire chief in Denis Leary's FX show Rescue Me.''

See also
 1972 Summit Series
 Hockey Hall of Fame
 List of Canadian sports personalities
 List of NHL players with 1,000 games played
 List of NHL players with 1,000 points
 List of NHL players with 500 goals
 List of NHL statistical leaders
 Notable families in the NHL

References

External links

 
 Esposito learned to love the Big Apple
 The Trade
 Phil Esposito, winner of the Lionel Conacher Award and the Bobbie Rosenfeld Award: Virtual Museum of Canada Exhibit

1942 births
Living people
Art Ross Trophy winners
Boston Bruins players
Boston Bruins announcers
Canadian ice hockey centres
Canadian ice hockey coaches
Canadian people of Italian descent
Canadian radio sportscasters
Chicago Blackhawks players
Hart Memorial Trophy winners
Hockey Hall of Fame inductees
Ice hockey people from Ontario
Lester B. Pearson Award winners
Lester Patrick Trophy recipients
Lou Marsh Trophy winners
National Hockey League All-Stars
National Hockey League players with retired numbers
New York Rangers coaches
New York Rangers executives
New York Rangers general managers
New York Rangers players
Officers of the Order of Canada
Sault Thunderbirds players
Sportspeople from Sault Ste. Marie, Ontario
St. Catharines Teepees players
St. Louis Braves players
St. Louis Braves (EPHL) players
Stanley Cup champions
Tampa Bay Lightning announcers
Tampa Bay Lightning executives
Canadian expatriate ice hockey players in the United States